Kenneth Frederick Ryan, Jr. (born October 24, 1968), is an American former baseball pitcher. He played eight seasons in Major League Baseball for the Boston Red Sox and Philadelphia Phillies.

Professional career
After graduating in 1986 from Seekonk High School in Seekonk, Massachusetts, Ryan was signed as an undrafted free agent by the Boston Red Sox. He worked his way through the Red Sox minor league system and made his MLB debut on August 31, 1992. Ryan spent the next three years splitting time between the parent team and the minors.

On January 29, 1996, he was traded with Lee Tinsley and Glenn Murray to the Philadelphia Phillies for Larry Wimberly, Heathcliff Slocumb and Rick Holyfield. He played in the Phillies organization until they released him on August 22, 1999.

He was signed as a free agent by the Pittsburgh Pirates on August 26, 1999, and played for their Triple-A affiliate Nashville Sounds. The Pirates released him at the end of the season.

During the 1999-2000 off-season, Ryan was signed by the New York Yankees and played for their Triple-A affiliate Columbus Clippers before retiring from professional baseball.

Personal life
Ryan married Odalys Rodriguez in Lakeland, Florida, in 1991. He currently resides in Seekonk, Massachusetts, with his wife and three daughters, Julia, Amanda and Kelli Rose.

Ryan is the owner of the KR Baseball Academy, an instructional facility for young players, in Lincoln, Rhode Island.

References

External links

MLB historical statistics

1968 births
Living people
Major League Baseball pitchers
Philadelphia Phillies players
Boston Red Sox players
Baseball players from Rhode Island
Columbus Clippers players
Nashville Sounds players
Pawtucket Red Sox players
Winter Haven Red Sox players
Nashua Pride players
Sportspeople from Pawtucket, Rhode Island
Clearwater Phillies players
Elmira Pioneers players
Greensboro Hornets players
Lynchburg Red Sox players
New Britain Red Sox players
Reading Phillies players
Sarasota Red Sox players
Scranton/Wilkes-Barre Red Barons players
Trenton Thunder players